Chang Khlan Road is a well-known shopping street in Chiang Mai, near Tha Phae Road, the main commercial and tourist street of the city. The road originated from the first night bazaar in Chiang Mai which sold handicrafts to tourists. Nowadays, the road has many brand name shops, local handicraft stores, newly designed handmade products, cafés and restaurants, hotels. The clientele is largely tourist. Locals tend to shop at the nearby Warorot Market.

Roads in Thailand
Shopping districts and streets in Thailand